Mititsyno is a rural locality (a village) in Domshinskoye Rural Settlement, Sheksninsky District, Vologda Oblast, Russia. The population was 164 as of 2002.

Geography 
Mititsyno is located 38 km southeast of Sheksna (the district's administrative centre) by road. Nesterovo is the nearest rural locality.

References 

Rural localities in Sheksninsky District